Sergey Grishchenko (4 April 1947 – 28 December 2000) was a Soviet alpine skier. He competed in three events at the 1972 Winter Olympics.

References

External links
 

1947 births
2000 deaths
Soviet male alpine skiers
Olympic alpine skiers of the Soviet Union
Alpine skiers at the 1972 Winter Olympics
People from Murmansk
Sportspeople from Murmansk Oblast